Cephalanthus glabratus is a species of flowering plant in the coffee family, Rubiaceae, that is native to South America. A common local name is sarandí colorado.

It was described by (Spreng.) K.Schum. and published in Flora Brasiliensis 6(6): 128, in 1888. 
Synonyms
Buddleia glabrata Spreng.	
Buddleja glabrata Spreng.basionym
Cephalanthus sarandi Cham. & Schltdl. 
Cephalanthus tinctorius Rojas Acosta

References

glabratus
Flora of Argentina
Flora of Uruguay
Plants described in 1888